The 2005 LNBP was the 6th season of the Liga Nacional de Baloncesto Profesional, one of the professional basketball leagues of Mexico. It started on June 30, 2005 and ended on November 21, 2005. The league title was won by Halcones UV Xalapa, which defeated Lobos de la UAdeC in the championship series, 4–1.

Format 
20 teams participate. The teams are divided in two groups of 10 teams each, called Zonas (zones): Zona Norte (North) and Zona Sur (South). The first 8 teams in each group qualify for the playoffs. The group playoffs have quarterfinals (best-of-5), semifinals (best-of-7) and finals (best-of-7). The winner of each group series qualify for the championship series (best-of-7), named Campeón de Campeones (Champion of Champions).

Teams

Regular season

Zona Norte standings 

Note: the LNBP website calculates 59 points for Lobos Grises de la UAD.

Zona Sur standings

Playoffs 
The playoffs were played between October 17 and November 21, 2005. The team seed is indicated after the team name. The winning team is bolded.

Zone quarterfinals

Zona Norte 
 Lobos de la UAdeC (1) vs. Correcaminos UAT Matamoros (8)
 Santos Reales de San Luis (2) vs. Correcaminos UAT Victoria (7)
 Fuerza Regia de Monterrey (3) vs. Correcaminos UAT Reynosa (6)
 Soles de Mexicali (4) vs. Lobos Grises de la UAD (5)

Zona Sur 
 Halcones UV Xalapa (1) vs. Barreteros de Zacatecas (8)
 Halcones UV Veracruz (2) vs. Gambusinos de Fresnillo (7)
 Lechugueros de León (3) vs. Panteras de Aguascalientes (6)
 La Ola Roja del Distrito Federal (4) vs. Tecos de la UAG (5)

Zone semifinals

Zona Norte 
 Lobos de la UAdeC (1) vs. Soles de Mexicali (4)
 Fuerza Regia de Monterrey (3) vs. Santos Reales de San Luis (2)

Zona Sur 
 Halcones UV Xalapa (1) vs. Tecos de la UAG (5)
 Lechugueros de León (3) vs. Halcones UV Veracruz (2)

Zone finals

Zona Norte 
 Lobos de la UAdeC (1) vs. Fuerza Regia de Monterrey (3)

Zona Sur 
 Halcones UV Xalapa (1) vs. Lechugueros de León (3)

Championship finals 
 November 16: Halcones UV Xalapa 115, Lobos de la UAdeC 103
 November 17: Lobos de la UAdeC 90, Halcones UV Xalapa 88
 November 19: Halcones UV Xalapa 105, Lobos de la UAdeC 99
 November 20: Halcones UV Xalapa 110, Lobos de la UAdeC 104
 November 21: Halcones UV Xalapa 107, Lobos de la UAdeC 92
 Halcones UV Xalapa defeats Lobos de la UAdeC, 4–1.

Copa Independencia 
The second edition of the Copa Independencia took place in September in Saltillo, and was played between the 8 best ranked teams at the end of the first part of the season (the first 4 ranked of each Zona). The competition was won by Lobos de la UAdeC (their second title), which defeated Correcaminos UAT Victoria in the final game, 101–83.

Quarterfinals 
 September 12: Galgos de Tijuana 109, Santos Reales de San Luis 96
 September 12: Correcaminos UAT Victoria 86, Halcones UV Veracruz 69
 September 12: Tecos de la UAG 93, Halcones UV Xalapa 91
 September 12: Lobos de la UAdeC 135, La Ola Roja del Distrito Federal 85

Semifinals 
 September 13: Correcaminos UAT Victoria 80, Tecos de la UAG 73
 September 13: Lobos de la UAdeC 119, Galgos de Tijuana 97

Final 
 September 14: Lobos de la UAdeC 101, Correcaminos UAT Victoria 83

All-Star Game 
The 2005 LNBP All-Star Game was played in Veracruz at the Auditorio Benito Juárez on September 15, 2005. The game was played between a team of Mexican players (Mexicanos) and a team of foreign players (Extranjeros). The Foreigners won, 105–96.

Teams 

Mexicanos
 Víctor Ávila (Halcones UV Xalapa)
 Óscar Castellanos (Halcones UV Veracruz)
 Florentino Chávez (Correcaminos UAT Victoria)
 David Crouse (Lobos de la UAdeC)
 Horacio Llamas (Soles de Mexicali)
 Omar López (Halcones UV Xalapa)
 Richard López (La Ola Roja del Distrito Federal)
 Víctor Mariscal (Halcones UV Xalapa)
 Anthony Norwood (Tecos de la UAG)
 Héctor Nungaray (Santos Reales de San Luis)
 Jorge Rochín (Lechugueros de León)
 Arim Solares (Santos Reales de San Luis)
 Enrique Zúñiga (Lechugueros de León)
 Coaches: Luis Manuel López (Santos Reales de San Luis) and Ángel González (Halcones UV Xalapa)

Extranjeros
  Boubacar Aw (La Ola Roja del Distrito Federal)
  Samuel Bowie (Halcones UV Xalapa)
  Robert Brown (Lobos Grises de la UAD)
  Darryl Hepburn (Tuberos de Colima)
  Byron Johnson (Algodoneros de la Comarca)
  Reggie Jordan (Lechugueros de León)
  Roland Lamont (Correcaminos UAT Matamoros)
  Reginald McKoy (Galgos de Tijuana)
  Matthew Mitchell (Panteras de Aguascalientes)
  Antonio Rivers (Halcones UV Veracruz)
  Antonio Robertson (Barreteros de Zacatecas)
  Galen Robinson (Correcaminos UAT Reynosa)
  Jamaal Thomas (Fuerza Regia de Monterrey)
 Coaches:  José Martínez Boglio (Fuerza Regia de Monterrey) and Ricardo Gilberto Benítez (Correcaminos UAT Victoria)

References

External links 
 2005 LNBP season on Latinbasket.com

LNBP seasons
2005 in Mexican sports
2005–06 in North American basketball